The San Roque González de Santa Cruz Bridge is a  long cable-stayed bridge that crosses the Paraná River between the cities of Posadas, capital of Misiones Province, Argentina and Encarnación, capital of Itapúa, Paraguay.

The bridge, named for the founder of the missions which evolved into both cities, was first projected in 1977 through an agreement between the governments of Argentina and Paraguay, as a compensation to Paraguay for the flooding of part of its territory by the Yacyretá Dam. Its construction began in 1981 and was planned to last three years, but was finished only in 1990. It was construct by a consortium leading by the Italian company Impregilo.

The road-rail bridge also carries the Posadas-Encarnacion International Train.

See also 
 General Urquiza Railway
 Rail transport in Paraguay

References

Cable-stayed bridges in Argentina
Bridges completed in 1990
Cable-stayed bridges in Paraguay
International bridges
Argentina–Paraguay border crossings
Bridges over the Paraná River
Misiones Department